Reverend Joseph Miller BD (born 1874) was a Congregational minister, much in demand as an "eloquent preacher" for 14 years in the north of England. While in Hamburg during his ministry he "rendered valuable assistance to his countrymen in distress" following a call from the American Embassy there.  However, in 1929 he "created a sensation" by becoming an Anglican priest. His first Anglican incumbency was as vicar of the Church of St Mark, Old Leeds Road, Huddersfield, England, from 1929 to 1931.

Life
His father was Saul Miller (1841–1902) who was born in Leesrigg, Cumbria and died in Wigton. He was a farmer of 273 acres, employing five men and one woman. His mother was Betty "Jane" Timperon (1846–1895), born in Keswick. They were married at Wigton in 1870. Joseph was born in Leesrigg or Allhallows, Cumbria, the second of five children, in 1874. He was descended from a long line of Anglicans. Miller said that "one of his uncles offered to send him to Oxford or Cambridge in order to prepare for the Anglican ministry." However he graduated from Nottingham Paton College, a dissenting academy, in 1900. In 1901 he was a boarder at Kirton House, Spalding Road, Kirton, Lincolnshire, and a student Congregationalist pastor at age 26. He married Lily Hemsley (born Newcastle 1875) in Nottingham in 1908.

Congregationalist
He was minister at the Congregational Church, Regent Street, Oldham 1904–1908. He was minister at Bethesda Church, Runcorn, 1908–1911, living with his wife at the eight-room Manse. He had just been appointed Minister of Spittal Congregational Church 1911–1912, when in 1911 he "received and accepted a unanimous call" to officiate in Hamburg.

He was Minister of the English Reformed Church, also described as the Congregational church, in Hamburg 1912–1914. World War I compelled him to leave. The Morpeth Herald claimed that he had completed four years there. In Hamburg he "rendered valuable assistance to his countrymen in distress." The church was closed, and he and his wife were asked by the American Consulate to work among the refugees in Hamburg. He was made treasurer of the British Emergency Relief Fund for Refugees. Alien men between 17 and 55 years old were interned, but doctors and clergy were permitted and advised to return home.

From May 1915 to 1922 he was the pastor of the Congregational Church, Morpeth, Northumberland. At his induction on 26 May 1915 there was "much rejoicing" due to his reputation as an "eloquent preacher and an earnest and energetic worker." On 8 August and 24 October 1915 the Morpeth Herald records that he preached morning and evening there. Sunday 13 May 1917 was the Pastor's Anniversary at the same church, where Miller preached morning and afternoon that day, with "special music" from the choir. On Whit Monday, 28 May 1917, he addressed a public meeting along with two other clerics at the Primitive Methodist Church, Howard Terrace, Morpeth. On Friday 17 July 1917 at Morpeth Town Hall, he gave a "limelight lecture" on the subject of food economy, under the auspices of the Food Control Campaign. On Friday 23 April 1920, Miller proposed a toast and gave a speech about Shakespeare, "far greater than England, far greater than empire", at the mayor's dinner during the St George's Day celebrations at the Earl Grey Hotel, Morpeth.

He was nonconformist pastor of Cleckheaton Westgate Congregational Church 1922–1929. On 4 November 1928 he preached in the morning and evening at the congregational Church in Ashbourne Road, Derby.

Published sermons

In 1925, while pastor at Cleckheaton, he published a small volume of sermons, entitled The Collapse of Christianity. The title of the book is the title of the first sermon. The United Methodist review said that: "These discourses have nothing sensational about them, but bear the stamp of a mind clear in thought, firm in conviction, and possessing the power of infusing its own glowing warmth into the lives of others ...The book ... contains a sermon on "The Work That Counts," which has pleased the writer of these lines greatly ... The fact is, this preacher has a progressive mind with a modern outlook."

The Berwickshire News and General Advertiser said that: "The series of sermons are marked by the work of the careful student and thinker. The optimistic note sounded in the opening sermon is refreshing ... The author's sound arguments ...admirably calculated to build up and stablish in the truth ... Mr Miller is well remembered locally where his many sterling qualities, while pastor of Spittal Church, endeared him to a much wider circle of friends than those which comprised his flock."

Anglican
By his announcement on 6 January 1929, he "created a sensation in nonconformist Spen Valley by going over to the Church of England." On 29 February he began a short training course at Cuddesdon College, Oxford which he completed in 1929. In the same year he was ordained as an Anglican deacon and priest by the Bishop of Wakefield. He was vicar of the Church of St Mark, Old Leeds Road, Huddersfield, and its parish 1929–1931, in association with the vicar of Huddersfield Parish Church, where he was at the same time senior curate.

He was chaplain or vicar of St James Stainborough, Barnsley, from August 1931 to November 1934, with a parish population of 500. On 5 August 1934 he chaired the 44th open-air music festival on the local cricket ground, in aid of the Beckett Hospital, Barnsley.

On 7 October 1934 he was offered the living of St Andrew's, Wakefield by the Bishop of Wakefield but did not accept it. In November of the same year he was offered the living of St Lucius, Farnley Tyas, Huddersfield, by the bishop. He remained there until at least 1939. On Thursday 28 May 1936 he was visiting Stainborough in officiate at the dedication of a new organ. On Wednesday 5 July 1939 he officiated at the funeral at Farnley Tyas of retired magistrate and brewer Thomas Edward Dickinson who was mourned by numerous businessmen, magistrates, freemasons and councillors. Dickinson had been one of Miller's churchwardens. Miller was about 65 years old in 1939; the date of his death is unknown.

References

Bibliography

External links

1874 births
People from Cumberland
20th-century Congregationalist ministers
20th-century English Anglican priests
20th-century British writers
Date of death unknown
British Congregationalist ministers
British religious writers
20th-century British male writers